Winner is the fifth studio album by Australian soul and R&B singer, Renée Geyer. It was released in November 1978 and peaked at number 69 on the Kent Music Report. Geyer recorded it in Los Angeles with Frank Wilson producing and was joined by her backing band of Tim Partridge on bass guitar, Mark Punch on guitar and backing vocals, and Greg Tell on drums together with session musicians. Two singles were provided from the album, "Money (That's What I Want)" (April 1978) and "Baby Be Mine" (October).

In her autobiography, released in 2000, Geyer wrote she was unhappy with the mixing of Winner and the lack of support from her American label, Polydor Records. She negotiated a release from her contract, brought the album tapes back to Australia where it was remixed and released. Geyer referred to the album as "a bit of a loser".

Track listing

Vinyl/ cassette (VPL1-0164)
Side One
 "Money (That's What I Want)" (Berry Gordy, Janie Bradford) - 5.19 
 "I Miss You" (Melvin Robinson, Judy Wieder) - 4.50
 "Save Me" (Mark Punch, Garry Paige) - 4.13
 "Baby I'm the One" (Dee Erwin, Alexandra Brown) - 4.36
 "Baby Be Mine" (Jean McClain) - 3.46
Side Two
 "Sweet Kisses" (Mark Punch) - 6.28
 "The Magic is Still There" (Punch, Paige) - 3.58
 "Bad Side of the Blues" (John Finley, Katherine Ornelas) - 4.03
 "Apartment C & D" (John Footman, Judy Wieder, Ron Cederlund) - 3.54 
 "I Don't Wanna Lose a Good Thing" (Jack Allen, Shelby Flint) - 3.50

Personnel

Renée Geyer Band
Renée Geyer – vocals, backing vocals
Mark Punch – guitar
Tim Partridge – bass guitar
Greg Tell – drums
Melvin Robinson – guitars
Nate Morgan – piano, clavinet, synthesizer
Michael Boddicker – synthesizer
 Neil Larsen – keyboard (tracks: 1, 5)
Ernie Watts – saxophone
Tower Of Power Horns – horns (tracks 3, 5, 7)
Jack Ashford – percussion
Frederick Lewis – percussion

Charts

References

1978 albums
Renée Geyer albums
albums produced by Frank Wilson (musician)
Mushroom Records albums
RCA Records albums